Veikko Sinisalo (30 September 1926 – 16 December 2003) was a Finnish actor. He appeared in 24 films and television shows between 1954 and 2002. He starred in Sven Tuuva the Hero, which was entered into the 9th Berlin International Film Festival.

Filmography

References

External links

1926 births
2003 deaths
People from Riihimäki
Finnish male film actors
20th-century Finnish male actors